Abdali Mall is a $300 million shopping mall located in Amman, Jordan. Developed and owned by the Abdali Mall Company, the mall opened in May 2016 and is part of the Abdali Project.

The multi-level shopping mall currently features 2400 parking spaces, over 160 retail outlets, several restaurants & cafes, an entertainment center, nine cinema screens and a supermarket.

See also
 Abdali Project

References

Tourism in Jordan
Shopping malls in Jordan